The career of Julius Caesar before his consulship in 59 BC was characterized by military adventurism and political persecution. Julius Caesar was born on July 12, 100 BC, Subura in Rome  into a patrician family, the gens Julia, which claimed descent from Iulus, son of the legendary Trojan prince Aeneas, supposedly the son of the goddess Venus. His father died when he was just 16, leaving Caesar as the head of the household. His family status put him at odds with the Dictator Lucius Cornelius Sulla, who almost had him executed. 

At about that time, Caesar found himself captured by pirates, only to crucify his former captors after he was ransomed. Soon he began his military career. He served in Hispania, married Sulla's granddaughter and was elected chief priest, all in rapid succession.

Shortly after this, he was suspected, though not convicted, of involvement in the Catiline Conspiracy. Soon he was leaving for a governorship in Hispania and positioning himself to be one of the most important figures in history.

Early life and family
Caesar was born into an aristocratic family, the gens Julia, which claimed descent from Iulus, son of the legendary Trojan prince Aeneas, supposedly the son of the goddess Venus. The cognomen "Caesar" originated, according to Pliny the Elder, with an ancestor who was born by caesarean section (from the Latin verb to cut, caedere, caes-). The Historia Augusta suggests three alternative explanations: that the first Caesar had a thick head of hair (Latin caesaries); that he had bright grey eyes (Latin oculis caesiis); or that he killed an elephant ( in Moorish, generally taken as Punic) in battle. Caesar issued coins featuring images of elephants, suggesting that he favoured this interpretation of his name. 

Despite their ancient pedigree, the Julii Caesares were not especially politically influential, having produced only three consuls. Caesar's father also called Gaius Julius Caesar, reached the rank of praetor, the second highest of the Republic's elected magistracies, and governed the province of Asia, perhaps through the influence of his prominent brother-in-law Gaius Marius. 

His mother, Aurelia Cotta, came from an influential family which had produced several consuls. Marcus Antonius Gnipho, an orator and grammarian of Gaulish origin, was employed as Caesar's tutor. Caesar had two older sisters, known as Julia Major and Julia Minor. Little else is recorded of Caesar's childhood. Suetonius and Plutarch's biographies of him both begin abruptly in Caesar's teens; the opening paragraphs of both appear to be lost.

The Marius-Sulla civil war
Caesar's formative years were a time of turmoil, and "savage bloodshed".  The Social War was fought from 91 to 88 BC between Rome and her Italian allies over the issue of Roman citizenship, while Mithridates of Pontus threatened Rome's eastern provinces. Domestically, Roman politics was divided between politicians known as optimates and populares. The optimates tended to be more conservative, defended the interests of the upper class and used and promoted the authority of the Senate; the populares advocated reform in the interests of the masses and used and promoted the authority of the Popular Assemblies. These were not official political parties, but were instead loose confederations of like-minded individuals who would often switch sides. Caesar's uncle Gaius Marius was a popularis, Marius' protégé Lucius Cornelius Sulla was an optimas, and in Caesar's youth their rivalry led to civil war.

Both Marius and Sulla distinguished themselves in the Social War, and both wanted command of the war against Mithridates, which was initially given to Sulla; but when Sulla left the city to take command of his army, a tribune passed a law transferring the appointment to Marius. Sulla responded by marching his army on Rome (the first time ever this happened and an influence for Caesar in his later career as he contemplated crossing the Rubicon), reclaiming his command and forcing Marius into exile, but when he left on campaign Marius returned at the head of a makeshift army. He and his ally Lucius Cornelius Cinna seized the city and declared Sulla a public enemy, and Marius's troops took violent revenge on Sulla's supporters. Marius died early in 86 BC, but his followers remained in power.

In 85 BC Caesar's father died suddenly while putting on his shoes one morning, without any apparent cause, and at sixteen, Caesar was the head of the family. The following year he was nominated to be the new Flamen Dialis, high priest of Jupiter, as Merula, the previous incumbent, had died in Marius's purges. Since the holder of that position not only had to be a patrician but also be married to a patrician, he broke off his engagement to Cossutia, a plebeian girl of wealthy equestrian family he had been betrothed to since boyhood, and married Cinna's daughter Cornelia.

Then, having brought Mithridates to terms, Sulla returned to finish the civil war against Marius' followers. After a campaign throughout Italy he seized Rome at the Battle of the Colline Gate in November 82 BC and had himself appointed to the revived office of dictator; but whereas a dictator was traditionally appointed for six months at a time, Sulla's appointment had no term limit. Statues of Marius were destroyed and Marius' body was exhumed and thrown in the Tiber. Cinna was already dead, killed by his own soldiers in a mutiny. 

Sulla's proscriptions saw hundreds of his political enemies killed or exiled. Caesar, as the nephew of Marius and son-in-law of Cinna, was targeted. He was stripped of his inheritance, his wife's dowry and his priesthood, but he refused to divorce Cornelia and was forced to go into hiding. The threat against him was lifted by the intervention of his mother's family, which included supporters of Sulla, and the Vestal Virgins. Sulla gave in reluctantly, and is said to have declared that he saw many a Marius in Caesar.

Military service

Feeling it much safer to be far away from Sulla should the Dictator change his mind, Caesar quit Rome and joined the army, serving under Marcus Minucius Thermus in Asia and Servilius Isauricus in Cilicia. He served with distinction, winning the Civic Crown for his part in the siege of Mytilene. On a mission to Bithynia to secure the assistance of King Nicomedes' fleet, he spent so long at his court that rumours of an affair with the king Nicomedes arose. The loss of his priesthood had allowed him to pursue a military career: the Flamen Dialis was not permitted to touch a horse, sleep three nights outside his own bed or one night outside Rome, or look upon an army.

Return to Rome
In 79 BC, Sulla resigned his dictatorship, re-established consular government and, after serving as consul in 80 BC, retired to private life. In a manner that the historian Suetonius thought arrogant, Julius Caesar would later mock Sulla for resigning the Dictatorship—"Sulla did not know his political ABC's". He died later in 78 BC and was accorded a state funeral. 

Hearing of Sulla's death, Caesar felt safe enough to return to Rome. Lacking means since his inheritance was confiscated, he acquired a modest house in the Subura, a lower-class neighbourhood of Rome. His return coincided with an attempted anti-Sullan coup by Marcus Aemilius Lepidus but Caesar, lacking confidence in Lepidus's leadership, did not participate. 

Instead he turned to legal advocacy. He became known for his exceptional oratory, accompanied by impassioned gestures and a high-pitched voice, and ruthless prosecution of former governors notorious for extortion and corruption. Even Cicero praised him: "Come now, what orator would you rank above him...?" Aiming at rhetorical perfection, Caesar travelled to Rhodes in 75 BC to study under Apollonius Molon, who had previously taught Cicero.

Kidnapping by pirates
On the way across the Aegean Sea, Caesar was kidnapped by Cilician pirates and held prisoner in the Dodecanese islet of Pharmacusa. He maintained an attitude of superiority throughout his captivity. While held captive for a period of thirty-eight days he would participate in his captors' games, exercise alongside them, and order them to be silent when they were loud. His only staff with him at the time were two attendants and a Physician, the rest had been sent off to borrow money for the ransom. During this time, Caesar also wrote poems and practiced his public speaking. He read his prose out loud to the pirates, flatly calling them illiterate barbarians if his work was not appreciated. The pirates were greatly entertained by his arrogance, which they attributed to the young man's age. When the pirates thought to demand a ransom of twenty talents of gold, he insisted they ask for fifty.  After the ransom was paid, Caesar raised a fleet, pursued and captured the pirates, and imprisoned them in Pergamon. Marcus Junctus, the governor of Asia, refused to execute them as Caesar demanded, preferring to sell them as slaves, but Caesar returned to the coast and had them crucified on his own authority, as he had promised while in captivity—a promise the pirates had taken as a joke. As a sign of leniency, he first had their throats cut.  He then proceeded to Rhodes, but was soon called back into military action in Asia, raising a band of auxiliaries to repel an incursion from Pontus.

Caesar begins a political career

On his return to Rome he was elected military tribune, a first step on the cursus honorum of Roman politics. The war against Spartacus took place around this time (73–71 BC), but it is not recorded what role, if any, Caesar played in it.  He was elected quaestor for 69 BC, and during that year he delivered the funeral oration for his aunt Julia, widow of Marius, and included images of Marius, unseen since the days of Sulla, in the funeral procession. His own wife Cornelia also died that year. 

After her funeral, in the spring or early summer of 69 BC, Caesar went to serve his quaestorship in Hispania under Antistius Vetus. While there he is said to have encountered a statue of Alexander the Great, and realised with dissatisfaction he was now at an age when Alexander had the world at his feet, while he had achieved comparatively little. He requested, and was granted, an early discharge from his duties, and returned to Roman politics. On his return in 67 BC, he married Pompeia, a granddaughter of Sulla. 

He was curator of the Appian Way in 66 BC and after taking out massive loans began a reconstruction project of the ancient road. This was a gamble as it placed him in early debt but allowed voters traveling to the city to see the work he had done. He was elected aedile and restored the trophies of Marius's victories; a controversial move given the Sullan regime was still in place. He also brought prosecutions against men who had benefited from Sulla's proscriptions, and spent a great deal of borrowed money on public works and games, outshining his colleague Marcus Calpurnius Bibulus. He was also suspected of involvement in two abortive coup attempts.

63 BC: Caesar comes to prominence

The trial of Gaius Rabirius

In 63 a tribune, Titus Labienus, prosecuted the elderly optimate senator Gaius Rabirius for the killing, 37 years previously, of the populist tribune Lucius Appuleius Saturninus, who had been declared a public enemy by the Senate after a candidate for the consulship had been murdered during an election. Caesar was one of the two judges, and Suetonius says he had bribed Labienus to bring the prosecution. The charge was the archaic offence of perduellio, a form of treason, the punishment for which was crucifixion. Rabirius was defended by Quintus Hortensius, who argued that he had not killed Saturninus, and Cicero, who argued that the killing of Saturninus was lawful as it had been done under the senatus consultum ultimum, a declaration of a state of emergency which authorised the consuls to do whatever it took to protect the Republic. Rabirius was convicted, and exercised his right of appeal to the people. During his appeal, a procedural technicality was contrived - the praetor Quintus Caecilius Metellus Celer took down the military flag from the Janiculum hill, indicating foreign invasion - and proceedings were adjourned. The prosecution was never resumed. The purpose of the trial is obscure, but it has been interpreted as a challenge to the use of the senatus consultum ultimum. Cassius Dio characterises it as a populist attack on the authority of the Senate. Labienus would remain an important ally of Caesar over the next decade, and served under him during the Gallic wars.

Pontifex Maximus
The same year, Caesar ran for election to the post of Pontifex Maximus, chief priest of the Roman state religion, after the death of Quintus Caecilius Metellus Pius, who had been appointed to the post by Sulla. He ran against two powerful optimates, the former consuls Quintus Lutatius Catulus and Publius Servilius Vatia Isauricus. There were accusations of bribery by all sides. Caesar is said to have told his mother on the morning of the election that he would return as Pontifex Maximus or not at all, expecting to be forced into exile by the enormous debts he had run up to fund his campaign. He won comfortably, despite his opponents' greater experience and standing, possibly because the two older men split their votes. The post came with an official residence on the Via Sacra.

The conspiracy of Catiline
When Cicero, who was consul that year, exposed Catiline's conspiracy to seize control of the republic, Catulus and others accused Caesar of involvement in the plot. Caesar, who had been elected praetor for the following year, took part in the debate in the Senate on how to deal with the conspirators. During the debate, Caesar was passed a note. Marcus Porcius Cato, who would become his most implacable political opponent, accused him of corresponding with the conspirators, and demanded that the message be read aloud. Caesar passed him the note, which, embarrassingly, turned out to be a love letter from Cato's half-sister Servilia.

Caesar argued persuasively against the death penalty for the conspirators, proposing life imprisonment instead, but a speech by Cato proved decisive, and the conspirators were executed. The following year a commission was set up to investigate the conspiracy, and Caesar was again accused of complicity. On Cicero's evidence that he had reported what he knew of the plot voluntarily, however, he was cleared, and one of his accusers, and also one of the commissioners, were sent to prison.

62 BC: Scandal

Praetorship
While praetor in 62 BC, Caesar supported Metellus Nepos, now tribune, in proposing controversial legislation that would recall Pompey and his army in order to quell the rising disorder in Italy. However, the pair were so obstinate in their proposals that they were suspended from office by the Senate. Caesar attempted to continue to perform his duties, only giving way when violence was threatened. The Senate was persuaded to reinstate him after he quelled public demonstrations in his favour.

The Bona Dea Scandal
That year the festival of the Bona Dea ("good goddess") was held at the domus publicus, Caesar's residence as pontifex maximus. No men were permitted to attend, but a young patrician named Publius Clodius Pulcher managed to gain admittance disguised as a woman, apparently for the purpose of seducing Caesar's wife Pompeia. He was caught and prosecuted for sacrilege. Caesar gave no evidence against Clodius at his trial, careful not to offend one of the most powerful patrician families of Rome, and Clodius was acquitted after rampant bribery and intimidation. Nevertheless, Caesar divorced Pompeia, saying that "the wife of Caesar must be above suspicion."

61 BC: Governorship in Hispania
After his praetorship, Caesar was appointed to govern Hispania Ulterior (Outer Iberia), but he was still in considerable debt and needed to satisfy his creditors before he could leave. He turned to Marcus Licinius Crassus, one of Rome's richest men. In return for political support in his opposition to the interests of Pompey, Crassus paid some of Caesar's debts and acted as guarantor for others. Even so, to avoid becoming a private citizen and open to prosecution for his debts, Caesar left for his province before his praetorship had ended. In Hispania he conquered the Callaici and Lusitani, being hailed as imperator by his troops, reformed the law regarding debts, and completed his governorship in high esteem.

60 BC: Campaign for the Consulship
By the time Caesar returned to Rome mid-year in 60 BC, the senate had granted him the title of imperator, a title which entitled him to a triumph. However, he also wanted to stand for consul, the most senior magistracy in the republic. If he were to celebrate a triumph, he would have to remain a soldier and stay outside the city until the ceremony, but to stand for election he would need to lay down his command and enter Rome as a private citizen. He could not do both in the time available. He asked the senate for permission to stand in absentia, but Cato blocked the proposal. Faced with the choice between a triumph and the consulship, Caesar chose the consulship.

See also
Julius Caesar (main article)
Ancient Rome
Caesar, Life of a Colossus a 2006 biography
The Roman Empire
The Roman Republic

References

External links
C. Julius Caesar Jona Lendering's in‑depth history of Caesar (Livius. Org)
Guide to online resources

History of Julius Caesar
Julius Caesar at BBC History
Grey, D. The Assassination of Caesar, Clio History Journal, 2009.

Early life
Caesar, Julius
Early lives by politician